Wäinö Valdemar Aaltonen (8 March 1894 – 30 May 1966) was a Finnish artist and sculptor. The Chambers Biographical Dictionary describes him as "one of the leading Finnish sculptors".

He was born to a tailor in the village of Karinainen, Finland. He became interested in art after being deaf as a child, and attended the School of Drawing of the Turku Art Association from age 16, or specifically between 1910 and 1915. He had spent many of the early years at this school studying painting, but he was mainly self-taught as a sculptor. He learned the technics of treatment of marble with his relative Aarre Aaltonen, and by working as a trainee stonemason in Hirvensalo. Sculptor Felix Nylund was a substitute teacher in the art school in Turku for one season, and his work was inspiration for young Aaltonen.

A journey Aaltonen made to Italy in 1923 opened his eyes to cubist and futurist art. These elements can primarily be seen in his paintings.

As the Republic of Finland arose, and the First World War raged, he sculpted War Memorials. He soon became a nationalist icon, the exemplar Finn, establishing an exhibition in Stockholm in 1927. His sculpture is nationalist in nature, and he is noted for monumental figures and busts portraying citizens of Finland. An example is the 1925 sculpture of Paavo Nurmi, a cast of which is exhibited outside the Helsinki stadium. Another notable work is that of Jean Sibelius, a bust of 1928. These two works, like the main body of his work, are bronze casts—though he did work in stone and even glass. Though chiefly naturalistic, the cubist influence is also present here. He was one of the early 20th-century pioneers of direct carving.

When the new House of Parliament for Finland was built, architect Johan Sigfrid Sirén wished he could buy sculptures directly from Aaltonen. Instead, an open competition was announced, and Aaltonen's Work and the Future was selected as the winner. The series of gilded plaster sculptures that Aaltonen completed in 1932 were cast in bronze after his death.

Aaltonen was married four times. His first wife was singer Aino Alisa Pietikäinen from 1920, second wife actor Elsa Emilia Rantalainen from 1931, third wife gallerist in Galerie Artek Elvi Elisabet Hernell from 1942 and fourth wife medical doctor Marie Elisabeth Maasik from year 1961. His son Matti Aaltonen became an architect, who designed e.g. Wäinö Aaltonen museum in Turku.

A large collection of his works are on permanent exhibition at the Wäinö Aaltonen Museum of Art in Turku. His work was also part of the sculpture event in the art competition at the 1948 Summer Olympics.

Works

Tytön pää, n. 1917
Graniittipoika, 1917–1920
Maria Jotuni, 1918–1920
Opettajani, 1919
Aaro Hellaakosken pronssipää, 1919
Savonlinnan sankaripatsas, (The Hero's Grave) 1919–1921
Punagraniittinen neito, 1923
Mustagraniittinen neito, 1924
Paavo Nurmi runner statue, 1924–1925
Seisova nainen, 1920–1924
Istuva nainen, 1920–1925
Uimaan lähtevä nainen, 1924
Turun Lilja, n. 1924–1926
Musica, 1926
Aleksis Kivi statue (Tampere), 1926–1927
Statues on Hämeensilta bridge, Tampere: Eränkävijä (the Hunter), Veronkantaja (the Tax Collector), Kauppias (the Merchant) ja Suomen neito (the Maiden of Finland), 1927–1929
Myrsky (Memorial statue for the 53 victims of the sunken Finnish torpedo boat S2 in Reposaari, Pori), 1930
Statues in the plenary chamber of Parliament House 1930–1932
Aleksis Kivi Memorial (Helsinki), 1930–1939
Marjatta, 1934
Delaware-muistomerkki, 1937–1938
Vapauden jumalatar seppelöi nuoruuden, 1939–1940
Memorial of the Battle of Kämärä, 1939/1949
Tampereen Osuustoimintamuistomerkki, 1949–1950
Ystävyys solmitaan (Joint monument for the cities of Turku and Gothenburg), n. 1948–1955
Lahden sankaripatsas, 1952
Rautatienrakentajien muistomerkki, 1957, Hyvinkää
Genius ohjaa nuoruutta (in front of the University of Turku main library), 1958–1960
Statues of presidents in front of Parliament house: K. J. Ståhlberg, 1957–1958; P. E. Svinhufvud, 1957–1959
Genius Montanus (on Aaltonen's grave in Turku), 1960
Johannes Gutenberg, 1962 (Büste)

References

External links

Wäinö Aaltonen Museum of Art in Turku 
Art Signature Dictionary, genuine signature by the artist Wäinö Aaltonen Here are 11 examples of Wäinö Aaltonen's signature and monogram, six dated from 1925 to 1940.

1894 births
1966 deaths
People from Pöytyä
People from Turku and Pori Province (Grand Duchy of Finland)
Modern sculptors
Recipients of the Prince Eugen Medal
20th-century Finnish sculptors
Olympic competitors in art competitions